Bodianus flavifrons, the masked pigfish, is a species of wrasse. 
It is found in the Southwest Pacific Ocean.

Size

References

flavifrons
Fish of the Pacific Ocean
Taxa named by Martin F. Gomon
Fish described in 2001